Shane Charles Cawood, better known as Charlie Cawood, is an English multi-instrumental musician, composer and music journalist, known for his cross-disciplinary musical skills as well as his work with a wide variety of projects and artists.

An active member of Knifeworld, Mediaeval Baebes, My Tricksy Spirit and Tonochrome, Cawood has worked in art rock, pop, folk and early music as well as Indian, Chinese and Balinese music and a variety of other forms. His first solo album, The Divine Abstract, was released in 2017.

Biography

Background and influences

Cawood is a native Londoner who began playing guitar at the age of eleven and soon developed a strong interest in experimental rock music. Educated at Loxford School of Science and Technology and training with Redbridge Music Services, he took classical exams up to ABRSM Grade 8, also playing in the RMS guitar ensemble and the Redbridge Youth Jazz Orchestra (winning the Jack Petchey Achievement award as well as the guitar prize at the Stratford & East London Music Festival two years running). While still a teenager, Cawood became interested in the music of other cultures. Learning flamenco guitar at Escuela de Baile, he also branched out into studying the music of India, China and Bali via the Asian Music Circuit, learning the sitar under Mehboob Nadeem and the Chinese pipa lute under Cheng Yu (leader of the UK Chinese Music Ensemble) during summer schools at the Royal Academy of Music).

Cawood graduated from both the Guitar Institute and the London Centre of Contemporary Music, gaining a Bachelor's degree in Popular Music Performance and Production. He went on to gain a Master's degree in Music Performance at SOAS, specialising in composition and in the music of East Asia and Southeast Asia).
 
Having continued to broaden his performance skills, Cawood currently plays around twenty different instruments. He regularly performs on guitar (acoustic, electric and nylon-string classical), bass guitar, sitar, zither, cuatro, hurdy-gurdy, lyre and lap harp as well as occasional keyboards, gamelan instruments and the taishōgoto (Nagoya harp). Cawood also specialises in a variety of lutes – the Greek bouzouki and tzouras; the Arabian oud; the Turkish cümbüş and bağlama (or saz); the Chinese pipa, liuqin and ruan (the latter in its tenor and bass zhongruan and daruan/moon lute variants); the Japanese shamisen and the European lute.

He should not be confused with the other London-based musician called Charlie Cawood (who leads the acid/roots rock project Time Space Reality Band).

Career
Even before graduation, Cawood was heavily involved in both London's live music scene and in touring music. By the age of seventeen, he'd become a professional musician. In 2006, at the age of eighteen, he toured as a backup guitarist for Icelandic alt-folk singer Hafdis Huld, during which time he also made his debut radio broadcast on Gideon Coe's BBC 6 Music show. Between the ages of nineteen and twenty-one, Cawood played guitar and bass guitar in Achilla, a Gothic progressive metal band (also featuring future Haken keyboard player Diego Tejeida) which got strong reviews from Metal Hammer for their eponymous debut EP (plus an 8/10 live review).

Cawood is currently the principal backing instrumentalist and co-arranger for Mediaeval Baebes (for whom he plays up to eight different instruments on tour) and he plays bass guitar, electric guitar, sitar and tzouras for the "electronic gamelan" group My Tricksy Spirit.

As an art-rock band member, Cawood is the bass guitarist for Knifeworld and Lost Crowns, and a guitarist for art-pop group Tonochrome, heavy rock/prog band Khronicles and the Frank Zappa cover band Spiders of Destiny. Cawood has also contributed guitar/bass guitar/bağlama to "noir art-deco pop" project Spiritwo and has covered for guitarist Keith Moline in Kev Hopper's "micro-riffing" art-rock quartet Prescott. He sometimes plays chamber folk with fellow Mediaeval Baebe Sophie Ramsay and currently performs hammer dulcimer with occasional sea shanty band Admirals Hard (alongside Knifeworld/Lost Crowns bandmates Kavus Torabi and Richard Larcombe plus other London art rockers). He has worked with goth/post-punk/industrial pop band Neurotic Mass Movement.

As a classical musician, Cawood is best known for having performed the pipa part for the UK premiere of Philip Glass' chamber opera Sound of a Voice but has also worked with the Chamber Music Company and the Temujin Ensemble.

Cawood is also a noted player on the London world music scene. He has performed Chinese music (mostly on daruan) with Yin Yang Collective, Central Asian music (on oud, bağlama and pipa) with Uzbek singer Alla Seydalieva, and Turkish/Romani music with Opaz Ensemble. He was also part of the Anatolian folk-fusion group which later launched the career of Olcay Bayir. As a gamelan musician, he's worked with LSO Community Gamelan Group and Lila Cita.
 
In addition to his work as a supporting player, Cawood composes his own instrumental music. His debut solo album, The Divine Abstract was released on the Bad Elephant Music label on 3 November 2017. Blending multiple aspects and influences from Cawood's career to date, the album featured twenty-one musicians drawn from his varied other bands and projects, including Mediaeval Baebes, Tonochrome, Knifeworld and assorted musicians associated with his SOAS alma mater. The Divine Abstract also featured forty-two different instruments drawn from European, Chinese, Indian and Middle Eastern traditions – various guitars and lutes; assorted keyboards, woodwinds, reeds, brass and strings; erhu, sitar, pipa, and a variety of percussion instruments from tuned Western orchestral to gamelan. The Divine Abstract received rave reviews, mostly from progressive rock magazines and websites. He has stated that although his music refers to and is influenced by avantgarde music, he doesn't aim to be avantgarde himself, preferring to produce "accessible" music. His second solo album, Blurring Into Motion, was released in 2019, featuring Marjana Semkina of iamthemorning as a guest vocalist on two tracks.

Cawood also works as an educator and writer. He teaches at the part-time guitar courses at the London Centre of Contemporary Music (part of the London College of Creative Media) and at All About the Band (a workshop for teenage musicians in the London borough of Southwark). He is a contributing writer for the folk and world music magazine Songlines. As an acknowledged sufferer from depression, he's written about the topic and its specific impact on musicians in an article written for Echoes and Dust.

Discography

as project leader
 The Divine Abstract (Bad Elephant Music, BEM052, 2017)
 Blurring into Motion (Bad Elephant Music, 2019)

as group member
 Knifeworld: Clairvoyant Fortnight EP (Believers Roast, BRR008, 2012)
 Tonochrome: Tonochrome EP (Andres Razzini, AR001, 2012)
 Tonochrome: Interference EP (Andres Razzini, AR002, 2013)
 Spiritwo: Primitive Twinship (Renge Kyo Music, RKMCD002, 2013)   
 Knifeworld: Don't Land On Me download-only single (Believers Roast, 2014) 
 Knifeworld: The Unravelling (Inside Out Music, 2014)
 Knifeworld: Home of the Newly Departed (Believers Roast, BR017/BR017LP, 2015)
 Spiritwo: Mesumamim single (Renge Kyo Music, RKMCD003, 2015)
 Knifeworld: Bottled Out Of Eden (Inside Out Music, IOMCD447/IOMLP 447, 2016)  
 My Tricksy Spirit: My Tricksy Spirit (Bad Elephant Music, BEM048, 2017)

as contributing musician
 Karin Fransson: Private Behaviour (Too Hip Records THR003CD, 2011) (sitar on 'Serious', electric guitar on  'Move On') 
 Matt Stevens: Lucid (Esoteric Antenna, EANTCD 1027, 2014) (bass guitar on 'Oxymoron', 'Unsettled', and 'The Bridge'; pipa on 'The Other Side')
 Olcay Bayir: Neva/Harmony (Riverboat Records, TUGCD1088, 2014) (nylon-string classical guitar throughout)
 Sinah: Sinah (Finaltune Records, FT 0601, 2015) (sitar and pipa on 'Loveless')
 Nick Prol & The Proletarians: Loon Attic (self-released, 2017) (guitar and bass guitar on 'Carvings on the Wall') 
 Lucie Treacher: Wunderkabinett EP (self-released, 2017) (guitar and bass guitar on 'Cross Fire')

References

External links
 Official homepage

1988 births
21st-century English bass guitarists
21st-century British male musicians
21st-century composers
Art pop musicians
Art rock musicians
Bağlama players
Bouzouki players
English classical musicians
English composers
English experimental musicians
English harpists
English male composers
English male guitarists
English multi-instrumentalists
English rock bass guitarists
English rock guitarists
Gamelan musicians
Hammered dulcimer players
Living people
Lutenists
Male bass guitarists
Musicians from London
Oud players
Pipa players
Progressive rock guitarists
Progressive rock musicians
Psychedelic rock musicians
Sitar players
Zither players
Knifeworld members